Andrey Horbach (born 20 May 1985) is a Belarusian former professional footballer

External links

1985 births
Living people
Belarusian footballers
Association football defenders
FC Neman Mosty players
FC BATE Borisov players
FC Neman Grodno players
FC Dnepr Mogilev players
FC Slutsk players
People from Masty
Sportspeople from Grodno Region